Dan Kolsrud is an American film producer. The movies he worked on were nominated 24 times at the Academy Award and won 3 Oscars.

Biography 
Dan Kolsrud is a 1970 graduate of the University of North Carolina Department of Radio, Television and Motion Pictures. After graduating, he worked in the television industry on the East coast for a few years, and then moved to Hollywood to work in movie production.

He is also Executive Vice President Worldwide Theatrical Physical Production for Metro-Goldwyn-Mayer since 2008.

Filmography
He was producer for all films unless otherwise noted.

Film

Second unit director or assistant director

Miscellaneous crew

Production manager

Thanks

Television

Second unit director or assistant director

References

External links 
 

American film producers
Year of birth missing (living people)
Living people
Metro-Goldwyn-Mayer executives